An era is a span of time.

Era or ERA may also refer to:

 Era (geology), a subdivision of geologic time
 Calendar era

Education 
 Academy of European Law, an international law school
 ERA School, in Melbourne, Australia
 Era University, in Lucknow, India

Games and sports
 Earned run average, a baseball statistic
 Elite Rodeo Athletes, a professional rodeo organization
 English Racing Automobiles, a manufacturer of racing cars
 Era Basket Liga (EBL), name of Polish Basketball League due to sponsorship reasons in 2003–2005

Media 
 Era (publisher), a Bulgarian publishing house
 Era (radio station), in Malaysia
 Era Television, a Taiwanese television network
 Improvement Era, a defunct magazine of The Church of Jesus Christ of Latter-day Saints
 Hellenic Radio, the main public radio broadcaster in Greece
 The Era (newspaper), a defunct British weekly
 TV Era, a television channel in Macedonia

Music
 Era (musical project), a New Age music project by French composer Eric Lévi
 Era (Era album), 1996
 Era (Disappears album), 2013
 Era (Echo Lake album), 2015
 Era (Elvenking album), 2012
 The Era (album), by Jay Chou
 Era, a 2007 album by In the Nursery
 "Era" (song), Italy's entry to the Eurovision song contest 1975
 Era Records, an American record label

People 
 Era. Anbarasu, Indian politician
 Era Bell Thompson (1905–1986), American journalist
 Era Bernard, Indian politician
 Era Istrefi (born 1994), Albanian musician
 Era Natarasan (born 1964), Indian writer

Places
 Era (river), of Tuscany in Italy
 Era, Ohio, United States
 Era, Texas, United States
 Era (reservoir), Ethiopia
 Era Quhila, another reservoir in Ethiopia

Politics and government 
 Electricity Regulatory Authority, of the Government of Uganda
 Electronic Records Archives, of the United States National Archives and Records Administration
 Environment and Resources Authority, a government agency of Malta
 European Radical Alliance, a defunct political group in the European Parliament
 European Union Agency for Railways
 Excellence in Research for Australia, a research assessment initiative of the Australian Government

Legislation
 Education Reform Act (disambiguation), or specifically
 Education Reform Act 1988 of the Parliament of the United Kingdom
 Kentucky Education Reform Act
 Massachusetts Education Reform Act of 1993
 Emergency Relief Appropriation Act of 1935 of the United States Congress
 Employee Rights Act, proposed legislation in the United States Congress
 Employment Relations Act 2000 of the Parliament of New Zealand
 Employment Rights Act 1996, of the Parliament of the United Kingdom
 Equal Rights Amendment, a proposed, but unratified, amendment to the United States Constitution
 State equal rights amendments, similar laws passed in various U.S. states

Science and technology
 ECMWF re-analysis in meteorology
 Eigensystem realization algorithm
 Electronic Reactions of Abrams, a discredited medical theory of Albert Abrams
 Elementary recursive arithmetic
 ERA (command), a file erase command under CP/M and DR-DOS
 European Research Area, a system of scientific research programmes
 European Robotic Arm, on the International Space Station
 Exobiology Radiation Assembly, an experiment in Earth orbit
 Explosive reactive armour
 EraMobile

Transport 
 Era Alaska, now Ravn Alaska, an American airline
 Era Aviation, a defunct American airline
 Eastham Rake railway station, in England
 European Regions Airline Association, a trade association
 Winnebago Era, a motorhome

Other uses
 Educational Research Analysts, an organization created by Mel and Norma Gabler
 Electricity Regulatory Authority, a Uganda government electricity regulatory agency.
 Electronic remittance advice
 Energy Resources of Australia, an Australian mining company
 Energy Retail Association, a trade association in Great Britain
 Engine room artificer, a Royal Navy position
 Engineering Research Associates, a defunct American computer manufacturer
 Entrepreneurs Roundtable Accelerator, an American startup accelerator
 Equal Rights Advocates, an American women's rights organization
 Equal Rights Association, a defunct American suffrage organization
 ERA Productions, an American animation studio
 ERA Real Estate, an American real estate franchise
 Eramet, a French multinational mining and metallurgy company
 European Rental Association, a trade association

Unisex given names